The 2023 New South Wales Rugby League Presidents Cup will be a competition to determine the best semi-professional Rugby League team in New South Wales. It will be the fourth season of the competition. The winners of each conference will play a 2 week knockout series to determine the Presidents Cup winners.

Presidents Cup

Central Conference (Ron Massey Cup) 
The Ron Massey Cup will feature 9 teams in 2023, the same number as 2022. All 8 of the 9 teams are based in Sydney in 2022, with the other team based in Fiji.

Teams

Ladder

Ladder progression 

 Numbers highlighted in green indicate that the team finished the round inside the top 5.
 Numbers highlighted in blue indicates the team finished first on the ladder in that round.
 Numbers highlighted in red indicates the team finished last place on the ladder in that round.
 Underlined numbers indicate that the team had a bye during that round.

Season Results

Round 1

Round 2

Round 3

Round 4

Round 5

Round 6

Round 7

Round 8

Round 9

Round 10

Round 11

Round 12

Round 13

Round 14

Round 15

Round 16

Round 17

Round 18

Finals Series

Northern Conference (Denton Engineering Cup) 
The Denton Engineering Cup will feature 11 teams in 2023, 1 up from 2022.

Teams

Ladder

Ladder progression 

 Numbers highlighted in green indicate that the team finished the round inside the top 5.
 Numbers highlighted in blue indicates the team finished first on the ladder in that round.
 Numbers highlighted in red indicates the team finished last place on the ladder in that round.
 Underlined numbers indicate that the team had a bye during that round.

Season Results

Round 1

Round 2

Round 3

Round 4

Round 5

Round 6

Round 7

Round 8

Round 9

Round 10

Round 11

Round 12

Round 13

Round 14

Round 15

Round 16

Round 17

Round 18

Finals Series

Southern Conference (Mojo Homes Illawarra Cup) 
The draw is yet to be released for the 2023 Mojo Homes Illawarra Cup.

Western Conference (Peter McDonald Premiership) 
The draw is yet to be released for the 2023 Peter McDonald Premiership.

References 

NSWRL